Twan Castelijns (born 23 January 1989 in Hapert, North Brabant, Netherlands) is a Dutch former cyclist, who rode professionally between 2014 and 2017 for the ,  and  squads. During his career, he contested two Grand Tours; the 2016 Giro d'Italia, and the 2017 Giro d'Italia.

Major results

2014
 10th Grote Prijs Stad Zottegem
2015
 3rd Arno Wallaard Memorial
 5th Ster van Zwolle
 6th Zuid Oost Drenthe Classic I
2017
 2nd Ronde van Drenthe
 6th Rund um Köln
 7th Omloop Mandel-Leie-Schelde
 8th Omloop Eurometropool
 9th Dwars door West-Vlaanderen

Grand Tour general classification results timeline

References

External links

1989 births
Living people
Dutch male cyclists
Sportspeople from Eindhoven
Cyclists from North Brabant
20th-century Dutch people
21st-century Dutch people